Zhangnaoliao is a railway station on the Forestry Bureau Alishan Forest Railway line located in Zhuqi Township, Chiayi County, Taiwan.

History
The station was opened on 1 October 1912. It used to be an important supplying place of camphor trees.

Architecture
The station is located 543 meters above sea level. It is a zig zag station.

See also
 List of railway stations in Taiwan

References

1912 establishments in Taiwan
Alishan Forest Railway stations
Railway stations in Chiayi County
Railway stations opened in 1912